Ravindranath Bhargava was an Indian politician from the state of the Madhya Pradesh. He represented Barghat Vidhan Sabha constituency of undivided Madhya Pradesh Legislative Assembly by winning General election of 1957.

References 

People from Seoni district
Madhya Pradesh MLAs 1957–1962
Year of birth missing
Year of death missing
Indian National Congress politicians from Madhya Pradesh